Kayaboyun is a village in the central district of Şırnak Province in Turkey. The village is populated by Kurds of the Dêrşêwî tribe and had a population of 466 in 2021. The hamlet of Oruçlu is attached to Kayaboyun.

The village was depopulated in the 1990s during the Kurdish–Turkish conflict.

References 

Kurdish settlements in Şırnak Province
Villages in Şırnak District